Speagonum is a genus of ground beetles in the family Carabidae. This genus has a single species, Speagonum mirabile. It is found on New Guinea.

References

Platyninae